Paisa Vasool (a common Hindi phrase meaning "value for money") is a 2004 Indian film directed by Srinivas Bhashyam, starring Manisha Koirala and Sushmita Sen. The film was Manisha Koirala's debut as producer.

Plot

After a chance encounter at a club the struggling actress Baby decides to move in with Maria, a withdrawn divorcee who is having financial troubles and run-ins with the mafia. By accident the two women overhear a conversation in which a man confesses committing a robbery to his girlfriend. The two women decide to blackmail him for a piece of the action. Unfortunately the robbers have no intention of just rolling over.

Cast
 Manisha Koirala – Maria
 Sushmita Sen – Baby
 Sushant Singh – Johnny
 Tinnu Anand
 Makrand Deshpande - Biryani
 Rakhi Sawant (item song 'Maine Saiyan Ki Demand')
 Rajkumar Kanojia

Critical reception

Ron Ahluwalia from Planet Bollywood gave the film 2.5/10 and stated "Burying your money in the ground would be wiser than even renting a movie like Paisa Vasool. It's just that simple: don't watch it!" Taran Adarsh of IndiaFM gave the film 0.5 stars out of 5, writing ″Director Srinivas Bhashyam is saddled with an uninspiring screenplay and he needs to partner the blame partly. He may be a sound technician, but a director ought to be a good story teller.″

Ronjita Kulkarni of Rediff.com gave a positive review, writing ″It must have taken guts for Koirala to make her production debut with a film like this. Her efforts are commendable. Paisa Vasool may not tell a unique story, but it definitely lives up to its name.″

Soundtrack

Ron Ahluwalia from Planet Bollywood gave the soundtrack 4/10 and chose 'Yaadon Mein' as his favorite song stating 'It’s a shame that Manisha was not able to get more songs like Yaadon Mein out of her composers and lyricist. This soundtrack should be looked upon as a pathetic follow-up by Bapi-Tutul on their work in Bhoot. In the end, one beautiful song cannot save a host of repulsive songs. Forget that Paisa Vasool ever had a soundtrack!'

Satyajit from Smashhits.com called the soundtrack 'a complete washout' stating that the soundtrack is 'rather a rehashed version of many remix albums'.

References

External links
 

2004 films
2000s Hindi-language films
Indian remakes of British films
Indian heist films
Films with screenplays by Anurag Kashyap